Clara Angela Macirone (20 January 1821 – 1914) was an English pianist and composer who published her music as C. A. Macirone. Born in London, she was the daughter of Italian musicians; her mother was also a pianist (a pupil of Charles Neate) and her father was an amateur tenor. She began her studies at the Royal Academy of Music in 1879 under Cipriani Potter, W H Holmes, Charles Lucas and others. She later took a position teaching at the Academy.

Her first concert was given at the Hanover Square Rooms on June 26, 1846, at which the baritone Johann Pischek performed her sacred song Benedictus, a composition later praised by Mendelssohn. She was active as a performer until 1864. After that, Macirone turned to teaching and composing. Her Te Deum and Jubilate were sung at Hanover Chapel and claimed to have been the first service by a woman ever used in the Church.

Macirone was a pioneer in the musical education of women as both a teacher and writer. She held teaching positions at Aske's School for Girls in Hatcham (1872-8) and at the Church of England High School for Girls, Baker Street. She contributed articles to The Girl's Own Paper and The Argosy. Macirone died in London in 1914.

Works
Selected works include:
Suite for piano and violin in E minor
 Rondino in G for piano
By the Waters of Babylon, anthem (sung at Canterbury, Ely and elsewhere)
Te Deum and Jubilate
Benedictus
Footsteps of Angels, choral
Come to Me, Oh Ye Children (Text: Henry Wadsworth Longfellow)
Fare thee well! and if for ever (Text: George Gordon Noel Byron, Lord Byron)
Hesperus (Text: Edwin Arnold after Sappho)
The Balaclava Charge (Text: Alfred, Lord Tennyson)
There is dew for the flow'ret (Text: Thomas Hood)

References

External links
 Musical Manuscripts Collection at the Harry Ransom Center

1821 births
1895 deaths
Women classical composers
English classical composers
Musicians from London
Alumni of the Royal Academy of Music
Academics of the Royal Academy of Music
Italian British musicians
19th-century classical composers
19th-century English musicians
19th-century British composers
Women music educators
19th-century women composers